Arnold Oborotov (born December 4, 1989) is a Lithuanian kickboxer.

Career
He faced Jarrell Miller at the K-1 World Grand Prix 2012 in Tokyo Final 16 on October 14, 2012. Although he was able to land some powerful low kicks on Miller, the American's boxing ability was too much for Oborotov and he lost by unanimous decision after being floored in round one.

He replaced Zabit Samedov to face Andrei Stoica in an elimination fight for a shot at the inaugural SuperKombat Heavyweight (−95 kg/209 lb) Championship at the SuperKombat World Grand Prix 2012 Final in Bucharest, Romania on December 22, 2012. He lost by knock out in the first round, the first KO loss of his career.

He faced Emmanuel Payet for the WKN World Oriental Rules Light Heavyweight Title at Fight Night Saint Tropez in Saint-Tropez, France on August 4, 2013, losing by decision.

He lost to Peter Graham via an extension round majority decision in the semi-finals of a heavyweight tournament at Global FC 3 in Dubai, UAE on May 29, 2014.

He lost to Nicolas Wamba at Fight Night Saint-Tropez II in Saint-Tropez, France on August 4, 2014. Wamba earned a cut above right eye in first round, but defeated Oborotov via a spectacular right head-kick.

In his next fight, during GFC Fight Series 2, Oborotov fought Badr Hari. Hari won the fight by a first round KO.

Titles
2019 KGP World Heavyweight Champion
2016 A1 WGP Final Heavyweight Tournament Runner Up
2016 A1 WGP Part 2 Heavyweight Tournament Champion
2014 ISKA European Heavyweight (−100 kg/-220 lb) K-1 Rules Champion 
2014 International Heavyweight Tournament +96 kg Champion
2011 World Kickboxing Network (W.K.N.) European Oriental Rules Grand Prix Champion 
2010 UKMF Cruiserweight British Champion
2009 UKMF English Champion

Kickboxing record 

|-
|-  bgcolor= "#CCFFCC" 
| 2019-07-13|| Win ||align=left| Lukasz Krupadziorow|| Kickboxing Grand Prix 22 ||  London, England || TKO (referee stoppage)|| 5 || || 40–15–1
|-
! style=background:white colspan=9 |
|-  bgcolor="#FFBBBB"
|-  bgcolor= "#CCFFCC" 
| 2018-04-08|| Win ||align=left| Stéphane Susperregui|| Fight Night Saint Tropez ||  Saint-Tropez, France || Decision (unanimous)|| 3 || || 39–15–1
|-  bgcolor="#FFBBBB"
|-  bgcolor= "#CCFFCC" 
| 2018-04-08|| Win ||align=left| Pavel Voronin|| Fight Night Saint Tropez ||  Saint-Tropez, France || TKO || 1 || || 38–15–1
|-  bgcolor="#FFBBBB"
|-  bgcolor= "#CCFFCC" 
| 2018-02-25|| Win ||align=left| Mathieu Kongolo|| K1 Event 11 ||  Troyes, France || KO|| 2 || || 37–15–1
|-  bgcolor="#FFBBBB
|-  bgcolor= "#CCFFCC" 
| 2018-02-25|| Win ||align=left| Billel Gazout|| K1 Event 11 ||  Troyes, France || Decision || 3 || || 36–15–1
|-  bgcolor="#FFBBBB"
|-
|-  bgcolor="#fbb"
| 2017-11-25 || Loss||align=left| Martin Pacas || Diamonds Fight Night III || Liptovský Mikuláš, Slovakia || Decision (Unanimous) || 5 || 3:00 ||35–15–1
|-
! style=background:white colspan=9 |
|-  bgcolor= "#FFBBBB" 
| 2016-10-13|| Loss ||align=left| Roman Kryklia || Partouche Kickboxing Tour 2016 – Final ||  France || TKO (Low Kicks) || 1 ||  || 35–14–1
|-
! style=background:white colspan=9 |
|-
|-  bgcolor= "#CCFFCC" 
| 2016-10-13|| Win ||align=left| Pavel Voronin || Partouche Kickboxing Tour 2016 – Semi Finals ||  France || Decision || 3 || 3:00 || 35–13–1
|-
|-  bgcolor= "#CCFFCC" 
| 2016-07-02|| Win ||align=left| Gokhan Gedik || Respect World Series 2: Clash of the Titans ||  London, England || Decision (split) || 3 || || 34–13–1
|-  bgcolor="#FFBBBB"
|-  bgcolor= "#CCFFCC" 
| 2016-05-21|| Win ||align=left| Yannick Vest || Partouche Kickboxing Tour 2016 – Etape 2 ||  Saint-Amand-les-Eaux || TKO (knees to the head)|| 3 || || 33–12–1
|-  bgcolor="#FFBBBB"
|-
! style=background:white colspan=9 |
|-
|-  bgcolor= "#CCFFCC" 
| 2016-05-21|| Win ||align=left| Bengaly Kieta || Partouche Kickboxing Tour 2016 – Etape 2 ||  Saint-Amand-les-Eaux || KO (left body hook) || 3 || || 32–11–1
|-  bgcolor="#FFBBBB"
|-  bgcolor= "#CCFFCC" 
| 2015-12-07 || Win ||align=left| Emmanuel Payet || KO Blood & Glory 6 ||  London, England || Decision || 3 || 3:00 || 31–11–1
|-  bgcolor="#FFBBBB"
| 2015-02-21 || Loss ||align=left| Pacôme Assi || K-1 Events 7, Semi Finals || Troyes, France || KO || 3 || || 30–11–1
|-
|-  bgcolor="#CCFFCC"
| 2014-11-16 || Win ||align=left| Simon Ogolla || Blood & Glory 4 ||  London, England || Decision || 3 ||  || 30–10–1
|-
! style=background:white colspan=9 |
|-
|-  bgcolor="#FFBBBB"
| 2014-10-16 || Loss ||align=left| Badr Hari || GFC Fight Series 2 ||  Dubai, UAE || KO (Right body shot) || 1 ||  || 29–10–1
|-
|-  bgcolor="#FFBBBB"
| 2014-08-04 || Loss ||align=left| Nicolas Wamba || Fight Night Saint-Tropez II  || Saint-Tropez, France || KO (right high kick) || 2 ||  || 29–9–1
|-
|-  bgcolor="#FFBBBB"
| 2014-06-29 || Loss ||align=left| Andrei Gerasimchuk || Kunlun Fight 6, Semi Finals ||  Chongqing, China || KO ||  || || 29–8–1
|-
|-  bgcolor="#FFBBBB"
| 2014-05-29 || Loss ||align=left| Peter Graham || GFC Fight Series 1 – Heavyweight Tournament, Semi Finals || Dubai, UAE || Ext. r. decision (majority) || 3 || 3:00 || 29–7–1
|-
|-  bgcolor="#CCFFCC"
| 2014-02-22 || Win ||align=left| Daniel Lentie || K1 Events 6 ||  Troyes, France || TKO (Retirement) || 2 || 0:00 || 29–6–1
|-
! style=background:white colspan=9 |
|-
|-  bgcolor="#CCFFCC"
| 2014-02-22 || Win ||align=left| Jaime Gomez Pastor || K1 Events 6 ||  Troyes, France || KO (Punches) || 2 || || 28–6–1
|-  bgcolor="#CCFFCC"
| 2013-11-02 || Win ||align=left| Mickey Terrill || KO Blood & Glory 3 ||  London, England || Decision || 3 || 3:00 || 27–6–1
|-  bgcolor="#FFBBBB"
| 2013-08-04 || Loss ||align=left| Emmanuel Payet || Fight Night in France || Saint Tropez, France || Decision || 5 || 2:00|| 26–6–1
|-
! style=background:white colspan=9 |
|- 
|-  bgcolor="#CCFFCC"
| 2013-05-18 || Win ||align=left| Nordine Mahieddine || URBAN BOXING UNITED 2013 ||  France || KO (Knee) || 2 ||  || 26–5–1
|-  bgcolor="#FFBBBB"
| 2012-12-22 || Loss ||align=left| Andrei Stoica || SuperKombat World Grand Prix 2012 Final || Bucharest, Romania || KO (punches) || 1 || || 25–5–1
|-
! style=background:white colspan=9 |
|-
|-  bgcolor="#FFBBBB"
| 2012-10-14 || Loss ||align=left| Jarrell Miller || K-1 World Grand Prix 2012 in Tokyo Final 16, First Round || Tokyo, Japan || Decision (unanimous) || 3 || 3:00 || 25–4–1
|-
|-  bgcolor="#c5d2ea"
| 2012-04-28 || Draw ||align=left| Jérôme Le Banner || Le Banner Series Acte 1 || Geneva, Switzerland || Decision draw || 5 || 2:00 || 25–3–1
|-
! style=background:white colspan=9 |
|-
|-  bgcolor="#CCFFCC"
| 2012-04-07 || Win ||align=left| Farid El Farsi || Explosion Fight Night Vol.5 || Châteauroux, France || TKO (Corner stoppage) || 1 || 1:57 ||
|-  bgcolor="#CCFFCC"
| 2011-11-12 || Win ||align=left| Revanho Blockland || O2 Xplosion || England || TKO (3 knockdowns) || 1 || 3:00 ||
|-  bgcolor="#FFBBBB"
| 2011-10-15 || Loss ||align=left| Stéphane Susperregui || Le Choc des Titans II || Graulhet, France|| Decision || 3 || 3:00 ||
|-  bgcolor="#CCFFCC"
| 2011-06-18 || Win ||align=left| Antonio De La Orden || Carcharias 2011, WKN Tournament, Final || Perpignan, France || TKO (kick to the body) || 1 || 1:03 ||
|-
! style=background:white colspan=9 |
|-
|-  bgcolor="#CCFFCC"
| 2011-06-18 || Win ||align=left| David Boyomo || Carcharias 2011, WKN Tournament, Semi Final || Perpignan, France || Decision || 3 || 2:00 ||
|-  bgcolor="#CCFFCC"
| 2011-03-06 || Win ||align=left| Corentin Jallon || KO Bloodline Show || London, England || KO || 1 ||  ||
|-  bgcolor="#FFBBBB"
| 2011-02-14 || Loss ||align=left| Mohamed Boubkari || Enfusion 2011 : Inside Out || Ko Samui, Thailand|| Decision || 3 || 3:00 ||
|-  bgcolor="#CCFFCC"
| 2010-09-25 || Win ||align=left| Dave McMahon || International Muay Thai || London, England || TKO (2 knockdowns) || 1 ||  ||
|-
! style=background:white colspan=9 |
|-
|-  bgcolor="#CCFFCC"
| 2010-04-25 || Win ||align=left| Lyndon Knowles || Muay Thai Addicts 3 || London, England || Decision (Unanimous) || 5 || 2:00 ||
|-  bgcolor="#FFBBBB"
| 2010-03-20 || Loss ||align=left| Ondrej Hutnik || Gala Night Thaiboxing || Žilina, Slovakia|| Decision (Unanimous) || 3 || ||
|-  bgcolor="#CCFFCC"
| 2009-12-13 || Win ||align=left| Arunas Andriuskevicius || Muaythai Addicts 2 || London, England || Decision (Unanimous) || 5 || 2:00 ||
|-  bgcolor="#CCFFCC"
| 2009-12-13 || Win ||align=left| Chris Wray || Muaythai Addicts 2 || London, England || KO (Punches) || 1 ||  ||
|-  bgcolor="#CCFFCC"
| 2009-12-13 || Win ||align=left| Chris Guyll || Muaythai Addicts 2 || London, England || KO (Right cross) || 1 ||  ||
|-  bgcolor="#CCFFCC"
| 2009-09-13 || Win ||align=left| Maxim Osipsov || Muaythai Addicts 2 || London, England || Decision (Unanimous) || 5 || 3:00 ||
|-
! style=background:white colspan=9 |
|-
|-  bgcolor="#CCFFCC"
| 2009-09-01 || Win ||align=left| Joe Colville || Muaythai Legends || London, England || TKO (Corner stoppage) || 1 || 2:00 ||
|-
|-  bgcolor="#CCFFCC"
| 2009-05-31 || Win ||align=left| Litu || Muaythai Addicts 1 || London, England || Decision (Unanimous) || 2 || 5:00 ||
|-
| colspan=9 | Legend:

References

External links

1989 births
Living people
Lithuanian male kickboxers
Lithuanian Muay Thai practitioners
Sportspeople from Vilnius
Lithuanian expatriate sportspeople in the United Kingdom
Heavyweight kickboxers
SUPERKOMBAT kickboxers